Antonio Aiello (born 26 July 1985), simply known as Aiello, is an Italian singer.

Career 
He debuted in 2011 with the single "Riparo" and released his first extended play, Hi-Hello, in 2017.

On 27 September 2019, he released his first studio album Ex voto with label RCA Records. In 2020, his song "Festa" was included in the soundtrack of the film Bangla and was nominated for best original song at David di Donatello.

He participated at the Sanremo Music Festival 2021 with the song "Ora".

Discography

Studio albums 
 Ex voto (2019)
 Meridionale (2021)

Extended plays 
 Hi-Hello (2017)

Singles 
"Riparo" (2011)
"Come stai" (2017)
"Arsenico" (2017)
"La mia ultima storia" (2019)
"Il cielo di Roma" (2020)
"Vienimi (a ballare)" (2020)
"Che canzone siamo" (2020)
"Ora" (2021)
"Fino all'alba (ti sento)" (2021)

References

External links

21st-century Italian  male singers
People from Cosenza
1985 births
Living people